Dimitrios Daras (born 21 April 1956) is a Greek former professional footballer who played as a midfielder.

References

1956 births
Living people
Association football midfielders
Greek footballers
Bundesliga players
2. Bundesliga players
Atlas Delmenhorst players
SV Werder Bremen players
Holstein Kiel players
SG Union Solingen players